Mecodema is a genus of large flightless ground beetle (Carabidae) endemic to New Zealand. The genus is very diverse in comparison to the other three New Zealand genera (Diglymma, Oregus, Orthoglymma) within the subtribe Nothobroscina (tribe Broscini). Mecodema is geographically widespread across both the North and South Islands, as well as numerous offshore islands, including the Three Kings Is., Poor Knights Is., Aotea (Great Barrier Is.) and Hauturu (Little Barrier Is.), Kapiti Is., Stephens Is., Stewart Is., Chatham Is., Snares Is.

Genus description 
Head, frons and vertex often rugose and / or punctate, microsculpture or macrosculpture absent in some species groups (e.g., curvidens species); eyes prominent, almost hemispherical; a single supraorbital puncture on each side, bearing more than one setae; setose punctures of vertex absent; mandibles large, uniformly narrow to the pointed apex, sharply curved in the apical third, mandibles with a number of dorsal grooves and without a seta in the scrobe; mentum with median process, which is notched to strongly indentate (bifid); usually with 2 setiferous punctures (may be absent) below the process and generally with 4–8 setose (setiferous) punctures along the submentum sclerite; labial palpi with setae on the penultimate segment; terminal segments of all palpi slightly compressed, sub-cylindrical, truncate; ligula chitinous with a median carina, 2 apical setae present; the membranous paraglossae extended well beyond the apex of the ligula; stipes with 2–3 basal setae; antennomeres I–II glabrous, III–V with apical ring, VI–XI setose throughout; antennomeres I–III subcylindrical, IV–VII subglobose and slightly compressed. Prothoracic carina (pronotal lateral margin) distinct with an asymmetrical number of setae along each side, the last never at the posterior lateral sinuation (posterior angle); midline (median groove) and pronotal foveae (laterobasal depressions) always present; pronotal disc often with shallow depressions on each side of apical half. Elytra always striate; fused together along the suture; hind wings absent; a row of setose punctures on the 7th stria and another row (umbilical series) near the lateral carina (elytral margin). Legs slender, the protibia with a pointed apical prolongation on the outer side, greatly distally expanded to distally expanded and shovel-like; male and female tarsi identical, the basal 4 segments of the anterior tarsi are as broad as they are long, usually slightly asymmetrical.

Type species: Mecodema sculpturatum Blanchard 1853.

Species and subspecies (102)

 Mecodema aberrans (Putzeys, 1868)
 Mecodema allani Fairburn, 1945
 Mecodema alternans Laporte de Castelnau, 1867
 Mecodema alternans hudsoni Broun, 1909
 Mecodema angustulum Broun, 1914
 Mecodema antarcticum (Laporte de Castelnau, 1867)
 Mecodema aoteanoho Seldon & Leschen, 2011
 Mecodema argentum Seldon & Buckley, 2019
 Mecodema atrox Britton, 1949
 Mecodema atuanui Seldon & Buckley, 2019
 Mecodema brittoni Townsend, 1965 
 Mecodema bullatum Lewis, 1902
 Mecodema chaiup Seldon, 2015
 Mecodema chiltoni Broun, 1917
 Mecodema constrictum Broun, 1881
 Mecodema costellum Broun, 1903
 Mecodema costellum gordonense Broun, 1917
 Mecodema costellum lewisi Broun, 1908
 Mecodema costellum obesum Townsend, 1965
 Mecodema costipenne Broun, 1914
 Mecodema crenaticolle Redtenbacher, 1868
 Mecodema crenicolle Castelnau, 1867 
 Mecodema curvidens (Broun, 1915)
 Mecodema ducale Sharp, 1886 
 Mecodema dunense Townsend, 1965
 Mecodema dunnorum Seldon & Buckley, 2019
 Mecodema dux Britton, 1949 
 Mecodema elongatum Castelnau, 1867
 Mecodema femorale Broun, 1921
 Mecodema florae Britton, 1949
 Mecodema fulgidum Broun, 1881
 Mecodema genesispotini Seldon & Buckley, 2019
 Mecodema godzilla Seldon & Buckley, 2019
 Mecodema gourlayi Britton, 1949
 Mecodema haunoho Seldon & Leschen, 2011
 Mecodema hector Britton, 1949 
 Mecodema howitti Castelnau, 1867
 Mecodema huttense Broun, 1915
 Mecodema impressum Castelnau, 1867 
 Mecodema infimate Lewis, 1902 
 Mecodema integratum Townsend, 1965
 Mecodema jacinda Seldon & Buckley, 2019
 Mecodema kipjac Seldon & Buckley, 2019
 Mecodema kokoroiho Seldon & Buckley, 2019
 Mecodema kokoromatua Seldon, Leschen & Liebherr, 2012
 Mecodema laeviceps Broun, 1904 
 Mecodema laterale Broun, 1917 
 Mecodema litoreum Broun, 1886
 Mecodema longicolle Broun, 1923
 Mecodema lucidum Castelnau, 1867
 Mecodema manaia Seldon & Leschen, 2011
 Mecodema metallicum Sharp, 1886
 Mecodema minax Britton, 1949
 Mecodema mohi Seldon & Buckley, 2019
 Mecodema moniliferum (Bates, 1867)
 Mecodema morio (Castelnau, 1867) 
 Mecodema ngaiatonga Seldon & Buckley, 2019
 Mecodema ngaitahuhu Seldon & Buckley, 2019
 Mecodema nitidum Broun, 1903
 Mecodema oblongum (Broun, 1882)
 Mecodema oconnori Broun, 1912
 Mecodema oregoides (Broun, 1894)
 Mecodema papake Seldon & Buckley, 2019
 Mecodema parataiko Seldon & Leschen, 2011
 Mecodema pavidum Townsend, 1965
 Mecodema perexiguus Seldon & Buckley, 2019
 Mecodema persculptum Broun, 1915
 Mecodema pluto Britton, 1949
 Mecodema politanum Broun, 1917 
 Mecodema ponaiti Seldon & Leschen, 2011
 Mecodema proximum Britton, 1949
 Mecodema puiakium Johns & Ewers in Johns, 2007
 Mecodema pulchellum Townsend, 1965 
 Mecodema punctatum (Laporte de Castelnau, 1867)
 Mecodema punctellum Broun, 1921
 Mecodema puncticolle Broun, 1915 [?=Mecodema sculpturatum Blanchard, 1843]
 Mecodema quoinense Broun, 1912 
 Mecodema rectolineatum Laporte de Castelnau, 1867
 Mecodema regulus Britton, 1964
 Mecodema rex Britton, 1949 
 Mecodema rugiceps Sharp, 1886
 Mecodema rugiceps anomalum Townsend, 1965
 Mecodema rusticulus Seldon & Buckley, 2019
 Mecodema scitulum Broun, 1894
 Mecodema sculpturatum Blanchard, 1843
 Mecodema simplex Castelnau, 1867
 Mecodema spiniferum Broun, 1880 
 Mecodema striatum Broun, 1904
 Mecodema strictum Britton, 1949
 Mecodema temata Seldon & Buckley, 2019
 Mecodema tenaki Seldon & Leschen, 2011
 Mecodema teparawhau Seldon & Buckley, 2019
 Mecodema teroroa Seldon & Buckley, 2019
 Mecodema tewhara Seldon & Buckley, 2019
 Mecodema tibiale (Laporte de Castelnau, 1867)
 Mecodema tuhoe Seldon & Buckley, 2019
 Mecodema undecimus Seldon & Buckley, 2019
 Mecodema validum Broun, 1923
 Mecodema wharekahika Seldon & Buckley, 2019
 Mecodema xylanthrax Seldon & Buckley, 2019
 Mecodema yconomus Seldon & Buckley, 2019
 Mecodema zonula Seldon & Buckley, 2019

References

Further reading 
 Seldon, D. S. (2015). A unique species of Mecodema (Carabidae: Broscini) from the Hawke's Bay region, New Zealand, with implications for North–South Island zoogeography. New Zealand Entomologist, 38(1), 28-35.
 Seldon, D. S., & Leschen, R. A. (2011). Revision of the Mecodema curvidens species group (Coleoptera: Carabidae: Broscini). Zootaxa, 2829(1), 1-45.
 Seldon, D. S., Leschen, R. A. B., & Liebherr, J. K. (2012). A new species of Mecodema (Carabidae: Broscini) from Northland, New Zealand, with notes on a newly observed structure within the female genitalia. New Zealand Entomologist, 35(1), 39-50.
 Townsend, J. I. (1965). Notes on the genus Mecodema (Coleoptera: Carabidae) with descriptions of new species from the South Island of New Zealand. New Zealand Journal of Science, 8(3), 301-318.
 Townsend, J. I. (1971). Entomology of the Aucklands and other islands south of New Zealand: Coleoptera: Carabidae: Broscini. Pacific Insects Monograph, 27, 173-184.
 NZ Entomologist
 
 Royal Society of New Zealand
 Landcare Research

 
Carabidae genera